Tommy Wonder may refer to:

Tommy Wonder (dancer) (1914–1993), American dancer
Tommy Wonder (magician) (1953–2006), Dutch magician